Muse is a wearable brain sensing headband. The device measures brain activity via 4 electroencephalography (EEG) sensors. An accompanying mobile app converts the EEG signal into audio feedback that is fed to the user via headphones. Muse is manufactured by InteraXon, a company based in Toronto, Ontario, Canada that was founded in 2007 by Ariel Garten, Trevor Coleman, Chris Aimone, and Steve Mann originally at 330 Dundas Street West (Steve Mann's lab), in Toronto, Ontario, Canada. Development of the Muse product began in 2003, and after several rounds of fundraising, was released to the public in May 2014. In 2018, the company launched Muse 2, which also measures heart rate, breath, and body movement.

The device operates by representing brain waves that correspond to a more relaxed state through the sound of tweeting birds, and higher amounts of brain activity is represented by storm sounds.

It was demonstrated that Muse can be used for ERP research, with the advantage of it being low cost and quick to setup. Specifically, it can easily quantify N200, P300, and reward positivity.

It is also widely used for a wide variety of other applications ranging from health and wellbeing to scientific and medical research.

It is claimed that using the headband helps in reaching a deep relaxed state.

Muse is worn over the ears and connects to a companion mobile app via bluetooth. The use of Muse enables the use of biofeedback, differing from a device like Thync that claims to actually alter brainwaves by wearing it.

References

Further reading

 The Wall Street Journal
 USA Today
 CNN
 Newsweek
 Financial Post
 Daily News and Analysis
 Toronto Star
 Haute Living
 The Globe and Mail
 Business Insider

External links 
 Official website
https://www.youtube.com/watch?v=EiaLhgFwUsQ

Wearable devices